Western Avenue is a street within the city of Chicago. Western Avenue, after turning into Asbury Ave, runs out on the north side at Green Bay Road in Evanston and on the south side at Crete-Monee Road in Crete. However, Western Avenue extends intermittently through the Southland to the Will/Kankakee county border in unincorporated Will Township. Within Chicago's grid street system, Western Avenue is 2400 West, three miles west of State Street (0 East/West).

Western Avenue becomes Asbury Avenue at Howard Street at the Chicago/Evanston border and continues north to Isabella Street on the Evanston/Wilmette border. Unlike Pulaski Road, which was originally Crawford Avenue in both the city and suburbs, Western was always the name in the city. Asbury is only used in Evanston.

In the suburbs, Western Avenue constitutes the boundary between several of Cook County's southern townships. North of 135th Street, Worth Township is on the west and Calumet Township is on the east; from 135th to 183rd Streets, Bremen Township is on the west and Thornton Township is on the east; and south of 183rd Street, Rich Township is on the west and Bloom Township is on the east.

History
From 1851 to 1869, Western Avenue delineated the western edge of the city of Chicago. Being at the edge of town, it became a picnic spot, and Riverview Park was built at the intersection of Western and Belmont Avenues.  The amusement park remained open from 1904 until 1967. The park's property is now home to the Riverview Plaza shopping center, the Belmont District Chicago Police Station, and DeVry University.

Rosehill Cemetery is also located on Western Avenue in the Lincoln Square neighborhood.

Transit
Western Avenue is serviced by many CTA buses and trains. The street is serviced by the Brown Line, Orange Line, Pink Line, two Western stations on the Blue Line on the O'Hare and Forest Park branches, and twice by Metra's commuter lines. There are three CTA buses that run along Western Avenue. The main bus route along Western Avenue is the 49 Western, which runs 24 hours a day/7 days a week from Berwyn Avenue on the North Side to 79th Street on the South Side. The 49B North Western runs from Howard Street at the city's northern border to Leland Avenue, where it connects to the Brown Line. The 349 South Western bus route, which is operated by Pace, has completely replaced CTA service on the former 49A South Western route. This route runs from 79th Street in Chicago to the Pace Harvey Transportation Center in Harvey, Illinois. Western Avenue is also the location of multiple stations of the Metra commuter rail network, on the BNSF Railway Line at (18th & Western), the Milwaukee District / North Line and Milwaukee District / West Line on Artesian near Grand, with the  station of the Rock Island District a few blocks east of Western Ave. in Blue Island.

South Side Irish Parade
Western Avenue also played host to the South Side Irish Parade.  Held yearly on the Sunday before St. Patrick's Day, along Western between 103rd and 115th Street in the Beverly and Morgan Park neighborhoods, it was the city's largest neighborhood parade, drawing hundreds of thousands of revelers annually.

The parade was canceled after the 2009 event due to a growing number of public intoxication arrests. There continues to be an annual Irish Festival, to replace the initially family-oriented parade. In 2012, the parade returned.

Chicagoland Toys for Tots Motorcycle Parade
Since 1979, Western Avenue has been the venue for what is billed as the largest motorcycle parade in the world. On the first Sunday of December, thousands of motorcyclists assemble at the Dan Ryan Woods Forest Preserve at 87th Street and Western Avenue, bringing new, unwrapped toys for donation to the Toys for Tots charity. The parade drives north to deposit toys at Lane Tech at Addison Street, a distance of over fifteen miles. From 1979 through 2008, the parade instead continued north to deliver the toys to the U.S. Marine Corps Reserve station on Foster Avenue, a total distance in excess of eighteen miles.

References

External links
 ForgottenChicago.com article on an Art Deco Era Streetscape on S. Western Ave.

Streets in Illinois
Streets in Chicago